The following is a list of episodes for the Australian factual television series Highway Patrol.

As of 12 August 2020, 11 seasons of the program have aired plus eight compilation specials, totaling 118 episodes.

Series overview

Episodes

Season 1 (2009)

Season 2 (2010–11)

Season 3 (2012)

Season 4 (2012)

Season 5 (2013)

Season 6 (2014)

Season 7 (2015)

Season 8 (2016)

Season 9 (2017)

Season 10 (2018)

Season 11 (2019)

Highway Patrol Specials
In 2014, two compilation specials aired, featuring scenes from previous seasons. Note that the first special debuted in NSW & QLD only initially, before being aired on 14 October 2015 nationally.

See also
Highway Patrol (Australian TV series)

References

Lists of reality television series episodes
Lists of Australian non-fiction television series episodes